The Gwanggaeto the Great-class destroyers (Hangul: 광개토대왕급 구축함, Hanja: 廣開土大王級 驅逐艦), often called KDX-I, are destroyers, but are classified by some as frigates, operated by the Republic of Korea Navy. It was the first phase of ROKN's KDX program, in moving the ROK Navy from a coastal defence force to a blue-water navy.

Development
The KDX-I was designed to replace the old destroyers in the ROKN that were transferred from the US Navy in the 1950s and 1960s. It was thought to be a major turning point for the ROKN in that the launching of the first KDX-I meant that ROKN finally had a capability to project power far from its shores. After the launching of the ship, there was a massive boom in South Korean international participation against piracy and military operations other than war.

Description

Weapon systems
The primary weapon deployed by Gwanggaeto the Great-class vessels is the Super Lynx helicopter, which acts in concert with shipboard sensors to seek out and destroy submarines at long distances from the ships. The Gwanggaeto the Great class also carries a close-in anti-submarine weapon in the form of the Mark 46 torpedoes, launched from triple torpedo tubes in launcher compartments either side of the forward end of the helicopter hangar. A secondary anti-shipping role is supported by the RGM-84 Harpoon surface-to-surface missile, mounted in two quadruple launch tubes at the main deck level between the funnel and the helicopter hangar. For anti-aircraft self-defense, the Gwanggaeto the Great class carries 16 RIM-7P Sea Sparrow. The Gwanggaeto the Great class also carries two 30mm Goalkeeper to provide a shipboard point-defense against incoming anti-ship missiles and aircraft. The main gun on the forecastle is an OTO Melara 127 gun.

Propulsion
The Gwanggaeto the Great class is powered by two General Electric LM2500-30 gas turbines and two SsangYong 20V 956 TB 82 diesel engines. The Gwanggaeto the Great class can reach a maximum speed of 30 knots.

Construction
All Gwanggaeto the Great-class destroyers were built by the Daewoo Heavy Industries Co., Inc. at Geoje, South Korea. In 1989, Daewoo Heavy Industries began working on the 4,000-ton destroyer which is now the secondary destroyer of the Korean navy, and the achievement was made through DSME's 100% design engineering for the first time in Korea.

The keel of the first ship was planned to have been laid down in late 1992 and the ship was planned to be completed in 1996. But due to definition studies that lasted until late 1993, the construction of the first ship did not started until April 1994 with the first steel cutting at Daewoo shipyard in Okpo.

Modernisation/Mid-Life Update
It was reported on April 27, 2016, that the KDX-1 class will undergo a limited mid-life upgrade at a cost of 67.41 billion won, aimed at replacing obsolete foreign equipment. The original command and control system (BAeSEMA SSCS Mk-7 combat management system) was replaced with Hanwha System's combat management system (likely Naval Shield ICMS), the installation of a domestic Towed Array Sonar System (TASS, likely from MteQ), LINK-16 and general equipment overhaul.

The first vessel, ROKS Yang Man-chun completed the upgrade in September 2020 at DSME, while the second vessel, ROKS Gwanggaeto the Great completed the upgrade in November 2021 and the final vessel, ROKS Ulchi Mundok completed the upgrade in December 2021.

Ships in the class

Bhumibol Adulyadej class

The  is a modification of the Gwanggaeto the Great class for the Royal Thai Navy. It differs from the Gwanggaeto the Great class with the addition of stealth features.
  (Active)
 HTMS Prasae (Postponed)

See also 
 List of naval ship classes in service
 List of active Republic of Korea Navy ships
 Korean Destroyer eXperimental

References

External links

 ROKN Navy website on KDX-I 
 Globalsecurity on KDX-I
 Powercorea on KDX-I

 
Destroyer classes